The 1976 Yugoslavian motorcycle Grand Prix was the fourth round of the 1976 Grand Prix motorcycle racing season. It took place on 23 May 1976 at the Opatija circuit.

350 cc classification

250 cc classification

125 cc classification

50 cc classification

References

Yugoslav motorcycle Grand Prix
Yugoslavian
Motorcycle Grand Prix